Communist propaganda played an important role in the Polish People's Republic, one of the largest and most important satellite states of the Soviet Union following WWII. Together with the use of force and terror it was instrumental in keeping the country's communist government in power and was designed to shape Polish society into a communist one.

Starting from the 1970s, Polish propaganda was significantly altered and then dominated by the form known as "propaganda of success".

See also
Censorship in the Polish People's Republic
Education in the Polish People's Republic
Polish underground press (bibuła)
Eastern Bloc information dissemination

References

External links
  Propaganda w PRL-u
  Internetowe Muzeum Polski Ludowej
  Komunizm, socjalizm i czasy PRL-u
  Propaganda komunistyczna

Polish People's Republic
Poland
Communist propaganda